ATP-binding cassette sub-family A member 3 is a protein that in humans is encoded by the ABCA3 gene.

The membrane-associated protein encoded by this gene is a member of the superfamily of ATP-binding cassette (ABC) transporters.  ABC proteins transport various molecules across extra- and intracellular membranes.  ABC genes are divided into seven distinct subfamilies (ABC1, MDR/TAP, MRP, ALD, OABP, GCN20, White).  This protein is a member of the ABC1 subfamily.  Members of the ABC1 subfamily comprise the only major ABC subfamily found exclusively in multicellular eukaryotes.  The full transporter encoded by this gene may be involved in development of resistance to xenobiotics and engulfment during programmed cell death.

Clinical significance 

Mutations in ABCA3 are associated to cataract-microcornea syndrome.

It is associated with Surfactant metabolism dysfunction type 3.

See also
 ATP-binding cassette transporter

References

Further reading

External links 
 
  
 

ATP-binding cassette transporters